Brosso is a comune (municipality) in the Metropolitan City of Turin in the Italian region of Piedmont, located about  north of Turin.

Brosso borders the following municipalities: Tavagnasco, Traversella, Borgofranco d'Ivrea, Quassolo, Lessolo, and Valchiusa.

References

External links
 Official website

Cities and towns in Piedmont